Jimmy Raymond (born 26 April 1996) is a Malaysian footballer currently playing as a defender for Kuching City.

Career statistics

Club

Notes

References

1996 births
Living people
Malaysian footballers
Association football defenders
Malaysia Super League players
Sarawak FA players
Kuching City F.C. players
People from Sarawak